Jonathan Dioso Tan (born August 12, 1978) is a Filipino politician and businessman who served as mayor of Pandan, Antique from 2010 to 2019.

He was one of the Philippines' Most Outstanding Mayors in 2012 together with city Mayors Alfredo Lim of Manila, Benjie Lim of Dagupan, Meynardo Sabili of Lipa, Edgardo Pamintuan of Angeles, Jennifer Austria-Barzaga of Dasmariñas, and Len Alonte-Naguiat of Biñan. He was the only municipal mayor who bagged the award on that year.

He served as President of the League of Municipalities of the Philippines – Antique and elected as PRO of LMP-National from 2013 - 2016. He was also the Secretary of the Northwest Panay Peninsula Biodiversity and Conservation Council.

Accomplishments
One of his major accomplishments was making Pandan a recipient of Pantawid Pamilyang Pilipino Program or 4P's, an anti-poverty project of DSWD. Mayor Tan's initiative to source out funds from Senators paved the way for more development projects in the municipality. His trademark, JDT, aside from it as an abbreviation of his name, stands for  Jobs, Development and Tourism. He managed to enhance the tourism industry in the town as Pandan was included in the 77 Tourism Development areas identified by DOT. It benefited not just the town itself, but also other Eco-tourism destinations in Northern Antique.

Speedboat Incident
In 29 March 2018, during the culmination of Semana Santa (Holy Week), a speedboat capsized near the coastal waters of Sebaste, a neighboring town of Pandan. According to reports from the Philippine Coast Guard, Tan was with two other people, when the boat capsized around five kilometers away from the coast of Sebaste. They were rescued after four hours at sea. Tan and his companion swam to the shoreline for half an hour and reached it 1:45 p.m. 

Among the others rescued are actresses Bianca Manalo and Ehra Madrigal, as well as Madrigal’s husband. While one other has died due to stroke and drowning.

References

1978 births
Living people
Mayors of places in the Philippines
Ateneo de Manila University alumni
University of Santo Tomas alumni